Century Boulevard is a major east–west thoroughfare in the southern portion of Los Angeles, California. Century Boulevard acts as a continuation of Tweedy Boulevard at Alameda Street in South Gate in its east end (Tweedy Boulevard in its east end starts slightly east of Atlantic Avenue), and ends in the west at the passenger terminals at Los Angeles International Airport. Due to its correspondence with the airport, the road has been dubbed "The Gateway to Los Angeles".

Route Description
Century Boulevard passes through Watts, Harbor Gateway, South Los Angeles, Inglewood, and Westchester. Upon its connection to the LAX terminal loop, Century Boulevard becomes World Way North, and upon leaving LAX it originates from World Way South.

The grid plan of Los Angeles and its numbering of east–west thoroughfares would call for a 100th Street in the position of Century Boulevard, thus spawning the more colloquial title.

Century Boulevard marks the southern border for Jesse Owens Park, the Hollywood Park Casino, SoFi Stadium and the Hollywood Park development, and The Village at Century strip mall in Inglewood.

Public transit
Metro Local Line 117 operates on Century Boulevard.

Future Developments

Potential Redevelopment
Los Angeles officials have expressed a desire to renovate Century Boulevard. In November 2017, city planners published a concept draft that outlined the potential renovation of 1.5 miles of the thoroughfare near LAX in order to modernize the area and to make the route more pedestrian-friendly. The project would potentially see the widening of sidewalks and bike lanes, the addition of new trees and landscaping, and the renovation of structures considered unsightly.

Future Los Angeles Metro stations
The Aviation/Century Metro station  and  Aviation/96 Street station are under construction Los Angeles Metro stations to serve the  new K Line, and the existing C Line. It will be an elevated light rail station at the intersection of Aviation and Century Boulevards, scheduled to open in 2021 and the other in 2023.

References

Streets in Los Angeles
Streets in Los Angeles County, California
Boulevards in the United States
Harbor Gateway, Los Angeles
Inglewood, California
South Los Angeles
Watts, Los Angeles
Westchester, Los Angeles